Feather River may refer to:

Rivers
Feather River in California in the United States, a principal tributary of the Sacramento River
Feather River (Alaska) in Alaska in the United States
Feather River (Idaho) in Idaho in the United States

Other places
Feather River, former name of Feather Falls, California

Transportation
Feather River Route a rail line, much of which travels through the Feather River Canyon in California.